Alejandro "Álex" Blesa Pina (born 15 January 2002) is a Spanish footballer who currently plays as a midfielder for Cultural y Deportiva Leonesa, on loan from Levante UD.

Club career
Born in Valencia, Blesa played youth football for Levante UD. In August 2018, while still a youth, he signed his first professional contract by agreeing to a deal until 2022.

On 26 August 2018, aged only 16, Blesa made his senior debut with the reserves, starting and playing 81 minutes in a 3–0 Segunda División B home win over CD Teruel. He scored his first goal on 8 September, netting his side's second in a 2–2 away draw against UE Olot.

Blesa made his first team – and La Liga – debut on 19 July 2020, coming on as a late substitute for captain José Luis Morales in a 1–0 home win against Getafe CF. On 24 June 2021, he was promoted to the main squad for the 2021–22 campaign.

On 28 January 2022, after failing to feature in a single league minute during the campaign, Blesa moved to Primera División RFEF side CD Castellón on loan. On 19 August, he moved to fellow league team Cultural y Deportiva Leonesa also in a temporary deal.

Career statistics

Club

Notes

References

External links

2002 births
Living people
Footballers from Valencia (city)
Spanish footballers
Association football midfielders
La Liga players
Primera Federación players
Segunda División B players
Atlético Levante UD players
Levante UD footballers
CD Castellón footballers
Cultural Leonesa footballers
Spain youth international footballers